Laurasiatheria ("laurasian beasts") is a superorder of placental mammals that groups together true insectivores (eulipotyphlans), bats (chiropterans), carnivorans, pangolins (pholidotes), even-toed ungulates (artiodactyls), odd-toed ungulates (perissodactyls), and all their extinct relatives. From systematics and phylogenetic perspectives, it is subdivided into order Eulipotyphla and clade Scrotifera. It is a sister group to Euarchontoglires with which it forms the magnorder Boreoeutheria. Laurasiatheria was discovered on the basis of the similar gene sequences shared by the mammals belonging to it; no anatomical features have yet been found that unite the group, although a few have been suggested such as a small coracoid process, a simplified hindgut (reversed in artiodactyls) and allantoic vessels that are large to moderate in size. The Laurasiatheria clade is based on DNA sequence analyses and retrotransposon presence/absence data. The superorder originated on the northern supercontinent of Laurasia, after it split from Gondwana when Pangaea broke up. Its last common ancestor is supposed to have lived between ca. 76  to 90 million years ago.

Etymology 
The name of this superorder derives from the theory that this group of mammals originated on the supercontinent of Laurasia. In contrast, extinct primitive mammals called Gondwanatheria existed in the supercontinent of Gondwana.

Classification and phylogeny

History of phylogeny

Uncertainty still exists regarding the phylogenetic tree for extant laurasiatherians, primarily due to disagreement about the placement of orders Chiroptera and Perissodactyla. Based on morphological grounds, bats (order Chiroptera) had long been classified in the superorder Archonta (e.g. along with primates, treeshrews and the gliding colugos) until genetic research instead showed their kinship with the other laurasiatheres. The studies conflicted in terms of the exact placement of Chiroptera, however, with it being linked most closely to groups such as order Eulipotyphla in the clade Insectiphillia. Two 2013 studies retrieve that bats, carnivorans and euungulates form a clade Scrotifera, indicating that Eulipotyphla might be the sister group to all other Laurasiatheria taxa.

Laurasiatheria is also posited to include several extinct orders and superorders. At least some of these are considered wastebasket taxa, historically lumping together several lineages based on superficial attributes and assumed relations to modern mammals. In some cases, these orders have turned out to either be paraphyletic assemblages, or to be composed of mammals now understood not to be laurasiatheres at all.
 Condylarthra (paraphyletic in relation to true ungulates, possibly polyphyletic since some forms may be afrotheres or even non-placental eutherians)
 Creodonta (order closely related to Carnivora, now polyphyletic and split in two orders: Hyaenodonta and Oxyaenodonta)
 Dinocerata (natural order closely related to perissodactyls)
 Meridiungulata (Collagen sequences found in Macrauchenia and Toxodon indicate this to be the sister taxon to perissodactyls, though in recent studies this clade was found to be polyphyletic)
 Mesonychia (natural clade, though several members, such as genus Andrewsarchus, are now thought to belong in other groups)

Taxonomy 
 Superorder: Laurasiatheria 
 Clade: Scrotifera 
 Order: Eulipotyphla  (true insectivores)

Phylogeny 
The phylogenetic relationships of superorder Laurasiatheria are shown in the following cladogram, reconstructed from mitochondrial and nuclear DNA and protein characters, as well as the fossil record.

See also 
 Mammal classification
 Boreoeutheria
 Gondwanatheria - a clade of mammaliaformes named after supercontinent of Gondwana

References

Further reading

External links
 

 
Mammal taxonomy
Mammal superorders